The James M. Delmar Fieldhouse is a 5,000-seat multi-purpose arena located in Houston, Texas. It is one of several Houston Independent School District’s athletics facilities.
  
The $35.2 million facility hosts basketball and volleyball games and tournaments, as well as graduation ceremonies and other special events. 
The maple court floor is removable and expandable, providing use for both the 84 feet required for high school games and the 94 feet required for NCAA play. The court flooring features a star representing the HISD logo and an image of the Houston skyline.  Lower level seating is retractable, allowing for additional floor space, if needed. The entrance to the arena also showcases a portion of the center court floor from the original fieldhouse

The entire area including the fieldhouse, stadium, softball and baseball fields are referred to as the Delmar-Tusa Sports Complex.

Demolition and Construction 
The Delmar Fieldhouse demolition project was part of the work planned under the 2012 Bond’s district athletic facility improvements. Demolition of the original 55-year old facility began in 2014 and the new building was completed in 2017.

History
Delmar Fieldhouse was the home court of the Houston Cougars men's basketball team, featuring Elvin Hayes, during the 1960s.  It hosted a Midwest regional quarterfinal game between the Cougars and the Marquette Warriors in 1961, the first NCAA men's basketball tournament game held in the city and second in the state of Texas, after the 1957 tournament, which held the Midwest Regional at the SMU Coliseum in Dallas.

In 2007, the WNBA's Houston Comets and Connecticut Sun played a pre-season game at Delmar Fieldhouse.

In 2008, it served as the home court for the Texas Southern University Tigers women's basketball team.

In 2017 Delmar Fieldhouse became a distribution center for the hurricane Harvey flooding crisis in Houston.  

In the new facility, Delmar hosted the 2018 Southwestern Athletic Conference men’s and women’s post-season basketball tournament.

See also
Delmar Stadium

References

External links
Delmar Fieldhouse renovation unveiling
Houston Comets practice at Delmar Fieldhouse

Houston Independent School District
Defunct college basketball venues in the United States
Basketball venues in Houston
Volleyball venues in Houston
Texas Southern Tigers basketball
Houston Cougars basketball venues
1958 establishments in Texas
Sports venues completed in 1958
2013 disestablishments in Texas
Sports venues demolished in 2014
2017 establishments in Texas
Sports venues completed in 2017